Bereznik is a rural locality (a selo) and the administrative center of Bereznitskoye Rural Settlement of Ustyansky District, Arkhangelsk Oblast, Russia. The population was 609 as of 2010. There are 20 streets.

Geography 
It is located on the Ustya River.

References 

Rural localities in Ustyansky District